Baba Marghuz (also Romanized as Bābā Marghūz; also known as Baba-Marguz and Bābā Mūrqūz) is a village in Dast Jerdeh Rural District, Chavarzaq District, Tarom County, Zanjan Province, Iran. At the 2006 census, its population was 17, in 6 families.

References 

Populated places in Tarom County